Shaun Garnett (born 22 November 1969) is an English former professional footballer who played as a defender. He played in The Football League for six clubs and is now a coach at Tranmere Rovers.

Playing career
Garnett began his career as an apprentice with Tranmere Rovers, where he made his Football League debut during the 1987–88 season. He turned professional in June 1988 and went on to make more than 100 Football League appearances for the club, during a period that saw Rovers climb from the fourth to the second tier of English professional football, with Garnett making three appearances at Wembley Stadium for Rovers between May 1990 and May 1991.

Garnett spent most of the 1992–93 season out on loan, completely an unwanted hat-trick of being involved in three relegations from the same division during the same season, at Football League Second Division sides Chester City (where he was the final debutant in Harry McNally's seven-year spell in charge), Preston North End and Wigan Athletic. He remained at Tranmere until March 1996, when he joined Swansea City for £200,000 but six months later he returned to north-west England with Oldham Athletic for £150,000.

Garnett spent six years in the Oldham first-team before joining Nationwide Conference side Halifax Town for 2002–03, in a loan move that became permanent. The following season he moved to Morecambe, in another loan deal that was made permanent. He was released at the end of the 2003–04 season and joined Harrogate Town as player-coach. He has since returned to Tranmere as part of the coaching staff at Prenton Park.

Honours

Tranmere Rovers

Football League Division Three play–off winners: 1990–91 (runners–up 1989–90).
Associate Members' Cup winners: 1989–90.

External links

Shaymen Online profile and stats
Morecambe FC career details

References

1969 births
Living people
People from Wallasey
English Football League players
National League (English football) players
English footballers
Association football defenders
Tranmere Rovers F.C. players
Chester City F.C. players
Preston North End F.C. players
Wigan Athletic F.C. players
Swansea City A.F.C. players
Oldham Athletic A.F.C. players
Halifax Town A.F.C. players
Morecambe F.C. players
Harrogate Town A.F.C. players
Tranmere Rovers F.C. non-playing staff